Axon Enterprise, Inc. is an American Scottsdale, Arizona-based company which develops technology and weapons products for military, law enforcement, and civilians.

Its initial product and former namesake is the Taser, a line of electroshock weapons. The company has since diversified into technology products for military and law enforcement, including a line of body cameras and Evidence.com, a cloud-based digital evidence platform. As of 2017, body cameras and associated services comprise a quarter of Axon's overall business.

History
In 1969, NASA researcher Jack Cover began to develop a non-lethal electric weapon to help police officers control suspects, as an alternative to firearms. By 1974, Cover had completed the device, which he named the "Tom Swift Electric Rifle" (TSER), referencing the 1911 novel Tom Swift and his Electric Rifle; to make it easier to pronounce as a word, Cover later added an "A" to the acronym to form "TASER". The Taser Public Defender used gunpowder as its propellant, which led the Bureau of Alcohol, Tobacco and Firearms to classify it as a firearm in 1976, a decision that limited sales. In 1980, the Los Angeles Police Department conducted a successful field test of an improved version (having reconsidered its earlier rejections of the technology after the shooting of Eula Love), but the device remained commercially unsuccessful and Cover's company, Taser Systems Inc., collapsed.

In 1993, Rick and Tom Smith formed AIR TASER, Inc. to, with Cover, design a version of the device that would use compressed nitrogen instead of gunpowder as a propellant. During development, the company faced competition from another vendor, Tasertron, whose product had become associated with its alleged ineffectiveness during the police confrontation of Rodney King.

After nearly going bankrupt marketing other products such as an electroshock-based anti-theft system for automobiles known as "Auto Taser", the company, later renamed TASER International, introduced its TASER M26 weapon in 1999. With a $6.8 million deficit in 2001, TASER International took steps to improve sales by offering to pay police officers to train others on how to use their products; this marketing technique helped improve the company's market share, reaching $24.5 million in net sales by 2003, and nearly $68 million in 2004.  In May 2001, they filed for an initial public offering and began trading on NASDAQ under the stock symbol TASR.

The company also took significant action against competitors, having acquired the aforementioned Tasertron, and aggressively defending its patents. Patent lawsuits by TASER International led to the shutdown of both Stinger Systems and its successor company, Karbon Arms; both companies were founded by Robert Gruder. Despite the controversies that have centered around the products (including deaths attributed to taser usage), the company maintained its dominant market position.

Shift towards bodycams 
In 2005, TASER International began to offer an accessory for its taser products, TASER Cam, which adds a grip-mounted camera that is activated after the safety is disengaged, to its battery pack. By October 2010, at least 45,000 TASER Cams had been sold.

In 2008, the company unveiled its first body camera, the Axon Pro. It was designed to be head-mounted, and upload footage for online storage on a web-based service known as Evidence.com. TASER's CEO Rick Smith explained that the products were designed to "help provide revolutionary digital evidence collection, storage and retrieval for law enforcement". The company piloted Axon Pro in various small cities and towns. In 2009, after prosecutor Daniel Shue exonerated Fort Smith police officer Brandon Davis based on footage from an Axon Pro camera, both Davis and Shue began to provide testimonials for the product in its marketing.

Especially in the wake of the Michael Brown shooting, the company's body camera business saw significant growth. Smith argued that the company was "not just about weapons, but about providing transparency and solving related data problems."  In April 2013, the Rialto Police Department released the results of a 12-month study on the impact of on-officer video using Axon Flex cameras. The study found an 88% drop in complaints filed against officers and nearly a 60% reduction in officer use-of-force incidents.

TASER opened an office in Seattle in 2013, and an international office in Amsterdam, Netherlands in May 2014. In June 2015, the company announced the formation of a new Seattle-based division known as Axon, which would encompass the company's technology businesses, including body cameras, digital evidence management, and analytics. Rick Smith explained that the branch was inspired by Microsoft's use of the Xbox brand to branch into entertainment businesses, stating that "Axon was the name that we used for selling cameras historically, but we realized that brand had the room to grow and encompass all of our connected technologies." The Taser brand would still be used for the company's weapons products.

On April 5, 2017, TASER announced that it had rebranded as Axon to reflect its expanded business. The company also announced an intent to offer free one-year trials of its body camera products and Evidence.com services to U.S. law enforcement agencies. While the Taser product line still contributes to a significant portion of its revenue, the company's technologies business had seen major gains. As of 2017, they comprised a quarter of the company's business, while Axon cameras had a market share of 85% among police departments in the United States' major cities. The rebranding was also intended to help distance the company from the negative stigma surrounding the Taser brand, with Smith acknowledging that they were "a bit of a distraction" when recruiting employees for its technology business.

In May 2018, Axon acquired competitor VieVu for $4.6 million in cash and $2.5 million in common stock.

Hardware

Taser

Law enforcement/military models 
There are three law enforcement/military models currently available:
 Taser X26P: An all-digital, single-shot capacity electrical weapon for law enforcement or military personnel.
 Taser X2: An all-digital, two-shot capacity electrical weapon for law enforcement or military personnel.
 Taser 7: An all-digital, two-shot capacity electrical weapon for law enforcement or military personnel.

Consumer models
Taser currently has three self-defense weapons for sale. They are the Taser Pulse, the Taser Pulse+, and the Taser Strikelight.

Body cameras

Axon Pro 
Taser's original body-worn camera, the Axon Pro, was introduced in 2009. The camera consists of three components, a head-mounted camera, a controller, and a monitor to review video recordings.

Second-generation models 
The second generation of Axon body cameras were simpler in form and function than the Axon Pro, removing the bulky monitor in favor of pairing with mobile phones. Many of the features introduced in these cameras, such as the pre-event buffer, a method of capturing video from before the record button was pressed, have become common requirements in body-worn camera requests for proposal. The Axon Flex and Body only record video in standard definition (SD).
 Axon Flex: The Axon Flex, a point-of-view camera, was released in 2012. The Flex camera system consists of a camera attached to an external battery pack / controller. In contrast to the Axon Pro, the Axon Flex does not have a screen to play back video. Instead, Taser offers a mobile application (Axon View) that connects to the camera using Bluetooth. Like the previous model, Axon Flex videos are stored in Evidence.com, Taser's cloud-hosted evidence management system. The camera features multiple mounting options, including a mount for Oakley, Inc.'s Flak Jacket® eyewear, in addition to collar, epaulette, ball cap, and helmet mounts.
 Axon Body: In 2013, Taser released the Axon Body, a single-unit camera similar in function to the Axon Flex. It features a wider field-of-view than the Flex, and also has simpler mounting options than the two-piece Flex. Although simpler, the body-mounted camera will not track what the officer is looking at as accurately as one mounted on the head.

Third-generation models 
 Axon Body 2: Redesigned and rebuilt on an Ambarella system-on-chip (SoC) video chip, the Axon Body 2 camera features full high-definition (HD) video, wireless activation, and other improvements over the original Body.Official Taser Website , Axon Body 2 for civilians
 Axon Flex 2: The Axon Flex 2, announced October 11, 2016, is a point-of-view camera  Like its predecessor, the Flex 2 consists of a camera attached to an external battery pack / controller. The new camera will feature a wider field of view (120 degrees vs. the Flex's 75 degrees), HD video, and other improvements over the original model.
 Axon Body 3: The Axon Body 3, announced on 2019, features enhanced low-light performance, reduced motion blur and an LTE connection that enables real-time features like live streaming, as well as wireless activation, and other improvements over the original Body and Body 2.

Other cameras 
In addition to body-worn cameras, Axon also offers interview room and in-car video systems, known as Axon Interview and Axon Fleet respectively. These systems, like the body cameras, integrate with the Evidence.com service.

Software

Evidence.com
Evidence.com is a cloud-based digital evidence management system that allows police departments, military command center or military outpost to manage, review, and share digital evidence, particularly video evidence captured with Axon-branded cameras. It includes an automated redaction tool, audit trails for chain of custody purposes, and functionality to share evidence with prosecutors and others. A free version is offered specifically for prosecutors to receive and manage incoming digital evidence.

Evidence Sync 
Evidence Sync is a desktop application that allows law enforcement officers or military personnel to review and upload evidence from hardware devices and local files. It is also used to upload logs from Taser weapons to Evidence.com. Although primarily intended to work with Evidence.com, it can also be used in offline mode to directly access files, if the agency prefers.

Axon mobile apps
Two mobile apps integrate with the Axon cameras and Evidence.com. Axon View can be paired with an Axon body camera to review, tag, and stream videos from the camera. The app can give an officer instant replay and on the spot evidence. This evidence can be crucial for officers and prosecutors. A new feature they added was GPS tagging. Officers can automatically map video evidence with real-time tagging of metadata. Axon Capture is an app that can be used to capture audio, photo, and video evidence and upload it to Evidence.com using an officer's mobile phone.

Axon Signal
Axon Signal is a range of products that are designed to automatically trigger recordings on Axon cameras in response to certain events, such as Signal Vehicle (which can trigger after the opening of doors or activation of sirens), Signal Performance Power Magazine (a successor to the TASER Cam accessory that triggers recordings when an Taser is armed), and Signal Sidearm (a sensor for handgun holsters which triggers recording when the gun is removed).

Axon Citizen
Axon Citizen is a cloud-based software solution that allows non-law enforcement personnel to share and upload information, including photos and video, directly to a law enforcement agency. Agencies are able to send links to any user, allowing them to upload evidence remotely. This functionality is supported by Axon's Evidence.com evidence management system. The product is described as incident-based system that seeks to "structure" and "streamline" the collection of crowd-sourced evidence.

Controversies

The company has noted that it has lost two product liability lawsuits:

However, on June 6, 2008, the company lost its first product-liability suit. The damages were reduced in the Court of Appeals in 2011.
TASER lost its second product liability suit.

In 2007, Polish immigrant Robert Dziekański died in custody at the Vancouver International Airport after Royal Canadian Mounted Police (RCMP) officers used a Taser on him multiple times. A provincial inquiry found the use to be unjustified, and in 2013, the British Columbia Coroners Service ruled the death to be a homicide—citing a heart attack caused by the repeated jolts as cause of death. The incident provoked discussion and inquiries into the appropriateness of Taser use in law enforcement in Canada.

In 2008, CBC News found that TASER X26 models manufactured before 2005 had a faulty fail-safe system.

In 2015, it was discovered that several TASER International employees, without mentioning their employment status, had review bombed listings on Amazon.com and iTunes Store for Killing Them Safely, a documentary film by Nick Berardini which documented and investigated major incidents that resulted from taser usage.

In January 2016, TASER International was sued by Digital Ally for infringing its two U.S. patents on the automatic activation of law enforcement body cameras. TASER International considered the suit to be "frivolous and egregious".

A Californian criminal defense lawyer noted that the Evidence.com terms of use gives the company a "non-exclusive, transferable, irrevocable, royalty-free, sub-licensable, worldwide license" to use photos and videos uploaded by its users, and that their policies may violate California privacy law (especially in regards to data involving juveniles).

In June, 2022, after Axon proposed a plan for taser-armed drones to stop school shootings, Axon's own ethics board expressed disagreement with the plan and issued a unanimous statement of concern. Nine members of the ethics board resigned.

Notes

References
 Anglen, Robert. "Taser tied to 'independent' study that backs stun gun." The Arizona Republic. May 21, 2005. 
 Johnson, Kevin. "Taser contributes to police families." USA Today. April 24, 2005. 
 "Taser research marred by conflicts." Vermont Huardian. May 23, 2005. 
 Frosch, Dan. "Ex-Albuquerque Police Chief Accused of Violating Ethics Laws in Auditor’s Report" "The Wall Street Journal". April 30, 2015.

External links

 

Companies listed on the Nasdaq
Companies based in Scottsdale, Arizona
Defense companies of the United States
Manufacturing companies based in Arizona
Manufacturing companies established in 1991
Taser
2001 initial public offerings